The 2014–15 season was Malmö Redhawks's eight consecutive season in the HockeyAllsvenskan, the second-highest league in the Swedish ice hockey system. The regular season began on 11 September 2014 at home against IF Björklöven, and concluded on 28 February 2015 at home against AIK. The team finished in third place in the regular season and thus qualified for play in the 2015 Slutspelsserien. Malmö Redhawks finished in third place in Slutspelsserien and qualified for Direktkval till SHL against Leksands IF. The team won the series 4–3 after defeating Leksand in the final game of the series. Malmö Redhawks were therefore promoted to the SHL for the 2015–16 season.

Standings

2014–15 HockeyAllsvenskan season

2015 Slutspelsserien

Schedule and results

Preseason

Regular season

2015 Slutspelsserien
Malmö Redhawks qualified to the 2015 Slutspelsserien by finishing in third place in the regular season. By merit of their ranking they were given three bonus points ahead of the start of the series. The series started on 5 March 2015 and concluded on 13 March 2015. Malmö Redhawks finished 3rd in the series and qualified to play in the Direktkval till SHL against Leksands IF.

2015 Direktkval till SHL
Malmö Redhawks qualified to the 2015 Direktkval till SHL by finishing in third place in Slutspelsserien. They faced Leksands IF from SHL who finished 11th in the 2014–15 SHL season. Leksand had home advantage in games 1, 3, 5 and 7 at Tegera Arena. Malmö Redhawks won the series 4–3 and qualified to play in the 2015–16 SHL season, their first season back in the first level of Swedish hockey since the 2006–07 season and the first since the league's renaming to SHL.

Player stats
Updated as of end of season

Skaters
Note: GP = Games played; G = Goals; A = Assists; Pts = Points; +/- = Plus-minus; PIM = Penalty minutes

†Denotes player spent time with another team before joining Malmö Redhawks. Stats reflect time with the Redhawks only.
‡Denotes player was traded mid-season. Stats reflect time with the Redhawks only.
(G)Denotes goaltender.
Team PIM totals include bench infractions.

Goaltenders
Note: GPI = Games played in; MIN = Minutes played; GAA = Goals against average; W = Wins; L = Losses ; SO = Shutouts; SA = Shots against; GA = Goals against; SV% = Save percentage

Final roster

 

 

 

 

 

 

 

|}

References

Malmo
Malmö Redhawks seasons